Chiloglottis pluricallata, commonly known as the clustered bird orchid, is a species of orchid endemic to the New England Tableland and Barrington Tops in New South Wales. It has two broad leaves and a single reddish to purplish brown flower with a callus of about six pairs of reddish to blackish glands covering two-thirds of the top of the labellum.

Description
Flowering occurs from November to January.

Taxonomy and naming
Chiloglottis pluricallata was first formally described in 1991 by David Jones from a specimen collected at Point Lookout and the description was published in Australian Orchid Research. The specific epithet (pluricallata) is derived from the Latin words plurimus meaning "most" and callus meaning "hard skin", referring to the many glands on the labellum of this orchid.

Distribution and habitat
The clustered bird orchid grows in grassy forest in mountainous areas on Barringon Tops and the New England Tableland.

References

External links 

pluricallata
Orchids of New South Wales
Plants described in 1991